McKinney National Airport , formerly  Collin County Regional Airport at McKinney, is a general aviation airport located in McKinney, Texas, United States, about 30 miles north of downtown Dallas.

The airport is a reliever airport for Dallas Love Field and Dallas/Fort Worth International Airport. It is owned by the City of McKinney and is home to many business aircraft, including the aircraft fleets of corporations such as Texas Instruments and Toyota Motor Corporation that are headquartered in nearby cities. It is an air base for PHI Air Medical which provides 24-hour emergency helicopter ambulance service. The only fixed-base operator (FBO) on the field is the city-run McKinney Air Center. There are two flight schools at the airport ATP and Grayhawk Flight Training. The airport housed Civil Air Patrol Texas Wing 295th Squadron from 2013 to 2014.

History
In the 1970s, the FAA proposed building the region's third major commercial airport, providing commercial air service to the fast-growing northern part of the Dallas–Fort Worth metroplex, in McKinney.  This failed after local voters rejected a $50 million bond needed to build the new airport facility.

A regional airport was established in McKinney in 1979.  Initially opened with a 4,000 foot runway, its length was extended to 5,800 feet in 1984.

In 2011, McKinney National Airport added a new 78-foot contract FAA control tower equipped with the latest in radar, radio and voice switch technology. In 2012, a new 7,000 foot long, 150 foot wide runway was completed that can handle large aircraft, with a maximum capacity of 450,000 pounds.

On November 1, 2013, the airport was purchased from Collin County by the City of McKinney for $25 million.  The McKinney City Council approved changing the airport's name from Collin County Regional Airport to McKinney National Airport later that month.

In 2018, a project to build a new executive terminal at McKinney National Airport began, which was originally slated to be completed in 2019.  In September 2019, completion was delayed until 2020 as the city and the construction contractor worked on modifications to the terminal's exterior.

In 2019, the airport received a $15 million grant from the Texas Department of Transportation to extend its runway an additional 1,500 feet (from 7,000 feet to 8,500 feet).

In 2023, the city voted to send a bond proposal to voters for $200M in bonds which, when combined with other funding, would allow the airport to become DFW's third major commercial airport.

Facilities
The concrete runway is 18/36, 7,002 feet (2,134m) long by 150 feet (45.72m) with a weight-bearing capacity of 450,000 pounds double tandem. It has high intensity runway lights, MALSR approach lights to Runway 18 and MALS approach lights to Runway 36, PAPI lights for runways 18 and 36, a runway 18 ILS Category I approach and RNAV approaches to both 18 and 36.

The airport has vehicle rental and US Customs services for international flights.

In 2012 the airport had 83,750 aircraft operations, average 229 per day: 99% general aviation, 1% air taxi and <1% military. 221 aircraft were then based at this airport: 82% single-engine, 10% multi-engine, 7% jet and 1% helicopter.

The airport has a contract FAA control tower open between 6:00 a.m. and 10:00 p.m.

References

External links
 McKinney National Airport, official website
 
 

Airports in Texas
Airports in the Dallas–Fort Worth metroplex
Buildings and structures in Collin County, Texas
Transportation in Collin County, Texas
McKinney, Texas